Neodermata is a clade of rhabditophoran flatworms containing the parasitic groups Trematoda, Monogenea and Cestoda.

Description 
All neodermatans are parasites, in many groups having a free-swimming larval stage. The most striking feature uniting all neodermatans is that the ciliated epidermis (typical of most flatworms) is cast off in adult worms, being replaced by a syncytium called tegument or  neodermis. Other characters found in all neodermatans are related to the anatomy of the protonephridium and the rootlets of epidermal locomotory cilia.

Phylogeny 
Currently, the monophyly of Neodermata is undisputed, being supported by both morphological and molecular data. It is clear that they evolved from free-living flatworms (turbellarians), but their sister-group was for a long time a matter of debate. The first attempts to reconstruct the phylogeny of flatworms, based on morphological evidence, considered Rhabdocoela to be the sister-group of Neodermata, but this was based on weak morphological similarities and was not supported by molecular studies.

The most recent evidences put the order Bothrioplanida as the sister-group of Neodermata, uniting them in a clade called Bothrioneodermata.

References 

Rhabditophora
Parasitic platyhelminthes
Protostome unranked clades